Bassi is a surname. Notable people with the surname include:

Arts and entertainment
Adolfo Bassi (1775–1855), Italian composer and operatic tenor
Amedeo Bassi (1872 - 1949), Italian tenor
Antonio Bassi (died 1782), Italian painter
Anubhav Singh Bassi (born 1991), Indian comedian
Aldo Bassi (1962–2020), Italian jazz trumpeter
Bartolomeo Bassi (c. 1600–c. 1640), Italian painter
Calisto Bassi (19th century–c. 1860), Italian opera librettist
Carolina Bassi (1781–1862), Italian contralto
Ettore Bassi (born 1970), Italian actor and television presenter
Francesco Bassi (1642–1732), Italian painter
Giovanna Bassi (1762–1834), Italian ballerina
Luigi Bassi (1766–1825), Italian operatic baritone
Luigi Bassi (clarinetist) (1833–1871), Italian composer and clarinetist
Maurizio Bassi (born 1960), Italian music composer and musician
Parsifal Bassi (1892–1960), Italian actor, screenwriter and film director
Priyanka Bassi, Indian television actress 
Sergio Bassi (1949–2020), Italian folk singer-songwriter
Sofía Bassi (1913–1998), Mexican painter and writer
Tullio Bassi (1937), Italian violin maker
Valentina Bassi (born 1972), Argentinian film and television actor

Sports
Amine Bassi (born 1997), Moroccan footballer
Davide Bassi (born 1985), Italian football player
Dick Bassi (1915–1973), American football player
Ekaterina Bassi (born 1977), Greek taekwondo practitioner
Fred Bassi, Canadian ice hockey player 
Giancarlo Bassi (1926–2019), Italian ice hockey player
Giorgio Bassi (born 1934), Italian race car driver
Harry Bassi (born 1969), Scottish rugby union player
Lucia Bassi (born 1936), Italian tennis player
Noelle Bassi (born 1983), U.S. swimmer
Nuvraj Bassi (born 1983), Canadian football player

Others
Agostino Bassi (1773–1856), Italian entomologist
Carlo Bassi (1807–1856), Italian entomologist
Charles Bassi or Charles (Carlo) Francesco Bassi (1772–1840), Finnish architect of Italian descent
Ghana Bassi, a leader of the Ghana empire during the time of conquest by the Almoravids
Giovanni Calderón Bassi (born 1971), Chilean politician and lawyer
Laura Bassi (1711–1778), Italian scientist
Livio Bassi (1918–1941), Italian aviator
Martino Bassi (1542–1591), Italian architect
Matteo Bassi (1495–1552), founder of the Order of Friars Minor Capuchin
Melvin Bassi (1926–2007), American lawyer and banker
Shaul Bassi, Italian professor of English and postcolonial literature 
Suzanne Bassi (born 1945), U.S. politician
Tina Lagostena Bassi (1926–2008), Italian lawyer
Ugo Bassi (1800–1849), Italian patriot

References